Cumulopuntia is a genus of cactus (family Cactaceae). This is a poorly defined genus, with constant change to what species fall under it and whether it should even be a separate genus from Opuntia, which it is often interchanged with. It was defined by Friedrich Ritter in 1980 by redefining multiple species in Tephrocactus and Opuntia. Still more work needs to be done to circumscribe Cumulopuntia as it stands.

Species list 
, Plants of the World Online accepted the following species:

References

Opuntioideae genera
Opuntioideae